George Bernard Shaw (24 October 1931 – 2 August 1984) was a Welsh cricketer.  Shaw was a right-handed batsman who bowled right-arm off break.  He was born in Treharris, Glamorgan.

Shaw made his first-class debut for Glamorgan against the Combined Services in 1951.  He made 15 further first-class appearances for Glamorgan, the last of which came against Surrey in the 1955 County Championship.  A bowler, Shaw took 26 wickets for Glamorgan, at an average of 27.15, with best figures of 5/38.  These figures came in his second first-class match against the Combined Services in 1952, a match in which he also took his other five-wicket haul of 5/67, to give him match figures of 10/105.  Typically though, he found it harder against county professionals.

He emigrated to Australia in 1978, where six years later he was killed in a car crash outside Port Pirie, South Australia, on 2 August 1984.

References

External links
George Shaw at ESPNcricinfo
George Shaw at CricketArchive

1931 births
1984 deaths
People from Treharris
Sportspeople from Merthyr Tydfil County Borough
Welsh cricketers
Glamorgan cricketers
Welsh emigrants to Australia
Road incident deaths in South Australia